Eresina fusca, the Cator's eresina, is a butterfly in the family Lycaenidae. It is found in Sierra Leone, Ivory Coast and possibly Nigeria. Its habitat consists of dense, primary forests.

References

Butterflies described in 1904
Poritiinae